Supinder Wraich is an Indian-born Canadian actress. She is most noted for her starring roles in the web series Guidestones, for which she won the Canadian Screen Award for Performance in a Program or Series Produced for Digital Media at the 3rd Canadian Screen Awards, and The 410.

Career 
Wraich was born in Chandigarh, India and raised in Toronto. In addition to a Bachelor of Arts degree in communications, Wraich graduated from Sheridan College's Advanced Film & Television Program and was chosen for a 2012 residency at the prestigious Canadian Film Centre.

She also had regular roles in the television series The 99, Copper and Crawford, and wrote and directed the short films Chinesey and Ruby's Tuesday. She also appeared in the music video of Imran Khan's hit single Pata Chalgea.

Personal life 
Wraich lives in Brampton, Ontario.

Filmography

Film

Television

References

External links
 

1993 births
Living people
Actresses from Chandigarh
Indian emigrants to Canada
Actresses from Toronto
People from Brampton
Canadian film actresses
Canadian television actresses
Canadian voice actresses
Canadian web series actresses
Canadian people of Indian descent
Canadian people of Punjabi descent
Canadian actresses of Indian descent
Sheridan College alumni
Canadian Film Centre alumni
Canadian Screen Award winners
21st-century Canadian actresses